Daniil Glinka (born 12 May 2000) is an Estonian tennis player.

Glinka has a career high ATP singles ranking of 737 achieved on 17 October 2022. He also has a career high ATP doubles ranking of 639 achieved on 26 September 2022.

Glinka represents Estonia at the Davis Cup, where he has a W/L record of 1–1.

References

External links

2000 births
Living people
Estonian male tennis players
21st-century Estonian people